The 2012 Gomelsky Cup was a European basketball competition that happened between September 29 and September 30 in Moscow. CSKA Moscow was the champion.

Participants
  CSKA Moscow - host
  Lokomotiv-Kuban Krasnodar - Eurocup participant
  Olympiacos Piraeus - Euroleague participant
  Žalgiris Kaunas - Euroleague participant

Tournament

Semifinal 1

Semifinal 2

Third Place

First Place

External links
 Summary results of Gomelsky Cup 2012 on Flashscore

2012
2012–13 in Russian basketball
2012–13 in Lithuanian basketball
2012–13 in Greek basketball